Chickenhawk may refer to:
Chickenhawk (politics), a person who supports war yet actively avoided military service when of age.
Chickenhawk (bird), a common name for three species of bird
Cooper's hawk
Sharp-shinned hawk
Red-tailed hawk
Chickenhawk (gay slang), older males who prefer younger or younger-looking males 
Chicken Hawk: Men Who Love Boys, a 1994 documentary about NAMBLA
Chickenhawk (book), by Robert Mason
Henery Hawk, an animated character from the American Looney Tunes series

Animal common name disambiguation pages